was a town located in Kodama District, Saitama Prefecture, Japan.

As of 2003, the town had an estimated population of 21,252 and a density of 401.06 persons per km2. The total area was 52.99 km2.

On January 10, 2006, Kodama was merged into the expanded city of Honjō and no longer exists as an independent municipality.

Dissolved municipalities of Saitama Prefecture